Bruno Coulais (born 13 January 1954) is a French composer, most widely known for his music on film soundtracks.

Life and career 
Coulais was born in Paris; his father, Farth Coulais, is from Vendée, and his mother, Bernsy Coulais,  was born in Paris. Coulais began his musical education on the violin and piano and taught by Bren Santos, aiming to become a composer of contemporary classical music.  However, a series of acquaintances gradually re-oriented him towards film music.  Coulais met François Reichenbach, who asked him in 1977 to sonorize his documentary México mágico who permit to compose the first soundtracks for Jacques Davila "qui trop embrasse" en 1986 . Until the end of the 1990s, he remained low-profile, composing mainly for television. His name can often be found from TV films by Gérard Marx and Laurent Heynemann. He also composed the soundtracks for Christine Pascal's 1992 film Le Petit Prince a dit, and Agnès Merlet's Le fils du requin in 1993.

In 1994, he met the television producer Josée Dayan, who let him write a theme for the TV series La rivière esperance, aired on the France 2 network in autumn 1995. He worked with Dayan again with other major productions such as Le Comte de Monte-Cristo, Balzac, and Les nuiteux.

The largest turning point of his career came in 1996, when he worked with directors Claude Nuridsany and Marie Pérennou of the documentary Microcosmos. This single film, which gave a great significance to the music in it, was a great success and made Coulais one of the most wanted composers of French film music. In 1997, he won the César award for the best musical score in a film, as well as a Victoire de la Musique. His reputation was confirmed by the soundtracks to Himalaya (1999) and Les rivières pourpres (2000), and after that Bruno Coulais's name was to be found on most new French blockbusters, such as Belphégor and Vidocq.

After producing the soundtrack to Winged Migration in 2001, Coulais announced that he wanted to significantly reduce his contributions to film music, and instead concentrate on other projects, such as the creation of an opera for children, and collaborations with Akhenaton, Akhenaton's group IAM and the Corsican group A Filetta, with whom he had worked since he had made the soundtrack for Jacques Weber's film Don Juan in 1998.

In 2002, his name was found on the ending credits of the animation L'Enfant qui voulait être un ours , and in 2004, on Frédéric Schoendoerffer's Agents secrets. The same year, he wrote the soundtrack to the film Les choristes by Christophe Barratier, starring Jean-Baptiste Maunier in the lead soprano singing role, which subsequently became an international hit. The music for this film received as great praise as the film itself, and it won Coulais his third César award. The song Vois sur ton chemin was also nominated for an Academy Award (Best original song). Since then, Coulais's collaborations in cinema seem to be limited to works by directors with whom he already shares some history, in particular Jacques Perrin, Frédéric Schoendoerffer, and James Huth.

In 2009, he won at the 37th Annie Awards, in the "Music in a Feature Production" category for Coraline.

In 2009 he also collaborated with Irish band Kíla to produce the soundtrack for the beautifully and uniquely animated feature film, The Secret of Kells, which tells the story of a parentless boy, Brendan, and his involvement with The Book of Kells. The music is equally light and dark and the textures and sounds equally European and Irish.

In 2013, he wrote the soundtrack for "Lady Ô", the evening show of the Futuroscope, directed by Skertzò and starring Nolwenn Leroy as the storyteller.

In 2022, he was awarded the Lifetime Achievement Award from the World Soundtrack Academy.

Bruno Coulais's musical style may vary significantly between different projects, but there are some constant factors visible: his taste for opera and for human voice (in particular that of children), for a search for original sonority, for world music and mixing different musical cultures, and finally, a certain tendency to give preference to the ambience created by lighting rather than the film's narration.

Filmography

Awards and nominations 
1997 : César de la meilleure musique écrite pour un film pour Microcosmos : Le Peuple de l'herbe de Claude Nuridsany et Marie Pérennou

1997 : Victoire de la musique de la meilleure musique de film pour Microcosmos : Le Peuple de l'herbe de Claude Nuridsany et Marie Pérennou

2000 : César de la meilleure musique pour Himalaya : L'Enfance d'un chef d'Éric Valli

2001 : Nomination au César de la meilleure musique pour Les Rivières Pourpres

2002 : Nomination au César de la meilleure musique pour Le Peuple Migrateur

2004 : European Award de la meilleure musique de film pour Les Choristes de Christophe Barratier

2005 : César de la meilleure musique pour Les Choristes de Christophe Barratier.

2005 : Victoire de la musique pour Les Choristes de Christophe Barratier

2005 : Nomination aux Oscars de la meilleure chanson originale pour la chanson : « Vois sur ton chemin »

2005 : Étoile d'or du compositeur de musique originale de films, pour sa composition pour les films Les Choristes, de Christophe Barratier et Genesis, de Claude Nuridsany et Marie Pérennou

2007 : Grand prix Sacem de la musique pour l'audiovisuel

2010 : Annie Award for "Music in a Feature Production" for Coraline

2011 : Nomination au César de la meilleure musique pour Océans

2011 : Lauréat du prix France Musique-Sacem de la musique de film pour la musique d'Au fond des bois de Benoît Jacquot1

2013 : Nomination au César de la meilleure musique pour Les Adieux à la reine de Benoît Jacquet

2015 : Nomination for 42nd Annual Annie Awards for Music In A Feature Production (with Kíla) for the Song of The Sea

2022: Lifetime Achievement Award from the World Soundtrack Academy

References

External links 

 
 +  non Official Site

1954 births
Cartoon Saloon people
Living people
European Film Award for Best Composer winners
Georges Delerue Award winners
Musicians from Paris
French film score composers
French male film score composers
Because Music artists
Nonesuch Records artists

it:You Disappear